Neukirchen an der Enknach is a municipality in the district of Braunau am Inn in the Austrian state of Upper Austria.

Geography
Neukirchen lies in the Innviertel. About 33 percent of the municipality is forest and 66 percent farmland.

References

Cities and towns in Braunau am Inn District